The 2019 Queensland Cup was the 24th season of the professional rugby league competition in Queensland, Australia. It was known by the sponsorship name, Intrust Super Cup.

Regular season 
All times are in AEST (UTC+10:00) and AEDT (UTC+11:00) on the relevant dates.

Round 1

Round 2

Round 3

Round 4

Round 5

Round 6

Round 7

Round 8

Round 9

Round 10

Round 11

Round 12

Round 13

Round 14

Round 15

Round 16

Round 17

Round 18

Round 19

Round 20

Round 21

Round 22

Round 23

References

2019 NRL season
2019 in Australian rugby league
2019 in Papua New Guinea rugby league